Lubkowice  is a settlement in the administrative district of Gmina Gościno, within Kołobrzeg County, West Pomeranian Voivodeship, in north-western Poland.

The settlement has a population of 160.

References

Lubkowice